El Deafo is a graphic novel written and illustrated by Cece Bell. The book is a loose autobiographical account of Bell's childhood and life with her deafness. The characters in the book are all anthropomorphic bunnies. Cece Bell, in an interview with the Horn Book Magazine, states "What are bunnies known for? Big ears; excellent hearing," rendering her choice of characters and their deafness ironic.

The graphic novel was adapted into a three-part animated miniseries for Apple TV+.

Plot
The book depicts the childhood of Cece Bell, who lost her hearing at a young age and required the assistance of a Phonic Ear hearing aid while she was growing up to be the person who she is now.

While the hearing aid enables her to hear the world around her, it also distances her from some children her own age because she is seen as "different".  This causes both frustration and depression in Cece, as she is desperate to find a true friend but frequently feels that she has to accept poor treatment from others being afraid of losing what few friends she has. She deals with these feelings by treating her hearing aid as a superpower, as it gives her the ability to hear everything.  For example, she hears private teacher conversations, as her teachers wear a tiny microphone that transmits sound to Cece's hearing aid; and not every teacher remembers to turn it off when they leave the classroom.  She adopts the secret nickname "El Deafo".

As time passes Cece grows more assertive and opens up to the people around her, especially when she meets a new friend who doesn't seem to care that she wears a hearing aid. She also grows comfortable in confronting people that treat her differently because of her deafness, finding that many of them are largely unaware that their actions cause her emotional harm. Ultimately Cece opens up to her new friend and reveals her secret persona as "El Deafo", much to the delight of her friend, who agrees to serve as her sidekick. As she gets older, she realizes that she no longer has to hide her "superpower" with others.

Characters
 Cecilia 'Cece' Bell: Main character
Dorn: Cece's kindergarten teacher
Mrs. Lufton:  Cece's 1st grade teacher
Mrs. Ikelberry: Cece's 3rd grade teacher
Mrs. Sinklemann: Cece's 5th grade teacher
Emma:  Cece's 1st best friend
Laura:  Cece's best friend in 1st and 2nd grade
Ginny Wakeley: Cece's new friend in 3rd grade
Martha Ann Claytor:  Cece's best friend in 5th grade
Mike Miller: Cece's 1st crush and new neighbor
Babarah Bell: Cece's mother
George Bell: Cece's father
Ashley Bell: Cece's older sister
Sarah Bell: Cece's older sister
Mr. Potts: Cece's gym teacher
El Deafo: Cece's alter-ego

Awards
El Deafo won a Newbery Honor in 2015. It also won the 2015 Eisner Award for Best Publication for Kids (ages 8–12).

Critical reception
Katherine Bouton, a writer from The New York Times, calls the book inspirational for those who are different.

Television adaptation
A three-part animated miniseries adaptation of the graphic novel was released on Apple TV+ on January 7, 2022. The miniseries features the voices of Pamela Adlon, Jane Lynch and Chuck Nice. The miniseries is narrated by author Cece Bell with music by Waxahatchee. Most of the dialogue is filtered through hearing aids.

See also
 Hearing loss
 Hearing aid

References

2014 graphic novels
2014 children's books
American graphic novels
American children's books
Autobiographical graphic novels
Eisner Award winners
Newbery Honor-winning works
Books about rabbits and hares
Literature about deaf people
Comics set in the 1970s
Comics set in the 1980s
Comics adapted into animated series
Biographies adapted into television shows
Children's books adapted into television shows
Apple TV+ children's programming
Amulet Books books